Séry Wawa (1943 – 12 December 2013) was an Ivorian footballer who primarily played as a defender.

Séry Wawa died on 12 December 2013, aged 70, in his hometown of Abidjan, Ivory Coast.

References

1943 births
2013 deaths
Footballers from Abidjan
Ivorian footballers
Ivory Coast international footballers
1965 African Cup of Nations players
Association football defenders